The 2021 Plano municipal elections took place on May 1, 2021. In addition to the mayoral election (Place 6), seats were contested for Places 2, 4, and 8, as well as a special election for Place 7. No candidate received a majority of the total vote in Places 2 and 7, so the two top vote-earners advanced to a runoff election. This election took place on June 5, 2021. Due to term limits, incumbent mayor Harry LaRosiliere was ineligible to run for a third term.

Council Seats

Place 2 
The incumbent, Anthony Ricciardelli, won re-election to a second term. Steve Lavine challenged him.

Place 4 
The incumbent, Kayci Prince, ran for re-election to a second term. Justin Adcock, Nassat Parveen, and Vidal Quintanilla also contested this race.

Runoff 
No candidate received 50% of the vote, so a runoff was held between Prince and Adcock on June 5, 2021. Prince won the runoff, retaining her seat on the council.

Place 6 (Mayor) 
The incumbent mayor, Harry LaRosiliere, was ineligible to run for a third term due to term limits. John Muns won the open seat, defeating challengers Lily Bao and Lydia Ortega.

Place 7 (Special Election) 
The incumbent, Lily Bao, resigned from her seat in order to run for mayor. A special election was called to determine who will serve the remainder of her term, which expires in 2023. Bao held her seat on the council until after the certification of the election's results. Julie Holmer, Bill Lisle III, Chris Robertson, David M. Smith, and Sandeep Srivastava ran for the open seat.

Runoff 
No candidate received 50% of the vote, so a runoff was held between Holmer and Robertson on June 5, 2021. Holmer won the runoff, filling Bao's seat until her term expires in 2023.

Place 8 
The incumbent, Rick Smith, won re-election to a second term. Elisa Klein challenged him.

Propositions

Proposition A 
The following question appeared on the ballot:The issuance of $231,000,000 general obligation bonds for street improvements and the imposition of a tax sufficient to pay the principal of and interest on the bonds.

Proposition B 
The following question appeared on the ballot:The issuance of $81,935,000 general obligation bonds for park and recreational facilities and the imposition of a tax sufficient to pay the principal of and interest on the bonds.

Proposition C 
The following question appeared on the ballot:The issuance of $15,900,000 general obligation bonds for improvements to the Tom Muehlenbeck Recreation Center and the imposition of a tax sufficient to pay the principal of and interest on the bonds.

Proposition D 
The following question appeared on the ballot:The issuance of $27,140,000 general obligation bonds for public safety facilities and the imposition of a tax sufficient to pay the principal of and interest on the bonds.

Proposition E 
The following question appeared on the ballot:The issuance of $5,500,000 general obligation bonds for improvements to existing municipal facilities and the imposition of a tax sufficient to pay the principal of and interest on the bonds.

Proposition F 
The following question appeared on the ballot:The issuance of $2,490,000 general obligation bonds for the city's library facilities and the imposition of a tax sufficient to pay the principal of and interest on the bonds.

References 

Plano mayoral
Mayoral elections in Plano, Texas
Plano